William Harwood Pincott (24 July 1875 – 3 March 1955) was an  Australian rules footballer who played with Geelong in the Victorian Football League (VFL).

Notes

External links 

1875 births
1955 deaths
Australian rules footballers from Victoria (Australia)
Geelong Football Club players